The following is a list of burials in the Valley of the Kings, in Thebes (modern Luxor, Egypt) and nearby areas.

The numbering system was established by John Gardner Wilkinson in 1821. Wilkinson numbered the 21 tombs known to him (some of which had been open since antiquity) according to their location, starting at the entrance to the valley and then moving south and east. Tombs that have been discovered since then have been allocated a sequential KV number (those in the Western Valley are known by the WV equivalent) in the order of their discovery.

Since the mid 20th century, Egyptologists have used the acronym "KV" (standing for Kings' Valley) to designate tombs located in the Valley of the Kings.

East Valley 

Most of the open tombs in the Valley of the Kings are located in the East Valley, and this is where most tourists can be found.

West Valley 
The numbering the West Valley follows in sequence to that of the East Valley, and there are only four known burials/pits in the valley.

See also 

 Minor tombs in the Valley of the Kings
 Theban Mapping Project

References

External links 
 Tomb Numbering Systems in the Valley
 List of tombs in the Valley of the Kings with accurate photographs and descriptions.

Valley of the Kings
Valley of the Kings
Valley Of The Kings
Valley of the Kings